Boissier is a surname, and may refer to:

 Bernard Boissier (born 1952), French football player
 François Boissier de Sauvages de Lacroix (1706–1767), French physician and botanist
 Marie-Louis-Antoine-Gaston Boissier (1823–1908), French classical scholar 
 Paul Boissier (1881–1953), English headmaster
 Paul Boissier (Royal Navy officer) (born 1953)
 Pierre Augustin Boissier de Sauvages (1710–1795), French naturalist and encyclopedist 
 Pierre Edmond Boissier (1810–1885), Swiss botanist, explorer and mathematician
 Yves Boissier (born 1944), French fencer

See also
 Fernando Léon (sailor), full name Fernando Léon Boissier
 June Gordon, Marchioness of Aberdeen and Temair, born Beatrice Mary June Boissier